Oh Darling may refer to:

Music 
 Oh Darling (band)

Songs 
 "Oh Darlin'", by the O'Kanes
 "Oh Darling" (song), by Alisa Mizuki
 "Oh! Darling", by the Beatles